{{Infobox animanga/Other
| title           = Related media
| content         = 
Kagetsu Tohya
Melty Blood
Melty Blood: Type Lumina
talk. and PreludeTsuki no SangoThe Garden of SinnersCarnival Phantasm}}

 is a Japanese adult visual novel created by the dōjin circle Type-Moon, who first released it at the Winter Comiket in December 2000. In 2003, it was adapted into both an anime television series, Lunar Legend Tsukihime, animated by J.C.Staff, and a manga series, which was serialized between 2003 and 2010 in MediaWorks shōnen magazine Dengeki Daioh, with 10 volumes released.

Several other related media have also been released, including the bonus disc Tsukihime Plus-Disc, a fan disc Kagetsu Tohya and the fighting game series Melty Blood. Story concepts and characters shared many similarities with other Type Moon's series The Garden of Sinners, and the two were also subtly connected. A remake with updated art and story was announced in 2008. The first part of the remake, Tsukihime -A piece of blue glass moon-, featuring a rewritten and expanded version of two of the original routes, was released on August 26, 2021. The second part, Tsukihime -The other side of red garden-, was teased in a secret unlockable trailer in -A piece of blue glass moon-. Melty Blood: Type Lumina, a new fighting game, was released worldwide on September 30, 2021 as companion to the remake titles.

GameplayTsukihime is a visual novel where the story is presented via text that intermittently presents choices for the player to make. These choices influence the story, some in large ways while others in small ways. Some choices lead to bad endings where the protagonist dies, after which the player can optionally view a comedic section called Teach Me, Ciel-sensei!, where a fourth-wall and breaking version of the character Ciel offers hints on what led to the bad ending. The game is divided into five routes, distributed amongst two scenarios: The Near Side of the Moon (Arcueid and Ciel routes), and the Far Side of the Moon (Akiha, Hisui and Kohaku routes). Every heroine except Kohaku has two possible endings. When the player has achieved all possible endings, a new epilogue part, entitled Eclipse, is unlocked.Tsukihime remake entries are visual novels like the original, and though it features modern amenities, (such as better skip functions) it plays mostly the same. The Teach Me, Ciel-sensei! section after a bad ending also returns. Unlike the original, both remakes of Near and Far sides titled Tsukihime -A piece of blue glass moon- and Tsukihime -The other side of red garden- are on separate release dates:
 Tsukihime -A piece of blue glass moon- solely focuses on the Near Side storyline. The Arcueid route titled Tsukihime has one ending, while Ciel route titled Rainbow in the Night has multiple endings.
 Tsukihime -The other side of the red garden- solely focuses on the Far Side storyline. This time adds a route that was not included in the original release and left unanswered in the fighting game series follow-up Melty Blood in original timeline, which stars Satsuki Yumizuka.

Plot
The game's plot follows the perspective of protagonist , a second-year high school student in the fictional town of Misaki. He suffers a life-threatening injury at a young age. After regaining consciousness, he gains the ability to see "Death lines" - lines by which things, living or not, will eventually break when they die. Due to his injury, Shiki has immense headaches as his mind cannot cope with the sight of death. Soon after he is given special glasses from Aoko Aozaki that blocks the sight of these lines. Due to his injury, Shiki is exiled by his father to a branch family of the Tohno household. Eight years later, he returns to accompany his sister after his father died. After moving back, Shiki has trouble adjusting to the old-fashioned lifestyle his sister lives by.

The original takes place in the fictional town of Misaki in 1999, while the remake titles take place in the fictional city of Soya in 2014, which becomes a true direct sequel to the storyline surrounding the character Aoko Aozaki, Witch on the Holy Night.

Characters
Main characters

 Voiced by: Kenji Nojima (Melty Blood, Carnival Phantasm), Ryosuke Kanemoto (remake), Kenichi Suzumura (Anime (2003)) (Japanese); Steve Staley (English)
 The main protagonist of the game, Shiki possesses mystical eyes which allow him to see the "Lines of Death" which, once traced, destroys whatever object or being they are on but only when he takes his glasses off. An accident eight years prior to the game's events resulted in him being excommunicated from the Tohno clan by his father, leading him to live with one of the branch families, the  clan. At the beginning of the game, he moves back home at the behest of his sister, Akiha after their father's death. He carries a switchblade which he uses as protection against the supernatural enemies he encounters.

 Voiced by: Ryōka Yuzuki (Melty Blood, Carnival Phantasm, Fate/EXTRA), Ikumi Hasegawa (remake), Hitomi Nabatame (Anime (2003)) (Japanese); Michelle Ruff (English)
 Arcueid is a mysterious princess of a born vampire race known as the "True Ancestor". She lacks some vampiric qualities, such as needing to consume blood to survive (although she suppresses the desire) and being nocturnal. She seems to be quite knowledgeable about many things, but is portrayed as very naïve when it comes to modern ideas. She is killed by Shiki in their first encounter, but regenerates, and recruits him to hunt a vampire.

 Voiced by: Kumi Sakuma (Melty Blood, Carnival Phantasm), Kaede Hondo (remake), Fumiko Orikasa (Anime (2003)) (Japanese); Wendee Lee (English)
 Ciel is introduced as an upperclassman of Shiki and is the sole member of the Japanese tea ceremony club, but is actually a secret agent of the Church's "Burial Agency" created to exterminate heresy. Before joining the agency, when she was sixteen years old, she used to be a seventh host of a certain Dead Apostle. However, even after Arcueid freed her from the Dead Apostle’s influence, Ciel was cursed with immortality and will continue to live as long as the Dead Apostle does.

Voiced by: Hitomi (Melty Blood, Carnival Phantasm), Shino Shimoji (remake), Shizuka Itō (Anime (2003)) (Japanese); Julie Ann Taylor (English)
 Shiki's younger sister, assumed the responsibility as the family's head and acquired the knowledge, behavior, and etiquette for an appropriate noble family. She has mixed feelings about her brother Shiki, whom she has been estranged with for seven years, and seeks him to live like an upper-class man.

However, those who've succumbed to the curse also lose their sanity, excluding those who've inherited willpower such as Akiha, certain members of the Arima, and the last surviving member of  clan.

 Voiced by: Miyu Matsuki (Melty Blood, Carnival Phantasm), Kana Ichinose (remake), Yumi Kakazu (Anime (2003)) (Japanese); Kate Higgins (English)
 The younger of the twin maids in the Tohno mansion and is a childhood friend of Shiki. She attends Shiki when he comes back to the Tohno mansion. She acts cold and unfeeling, but it is only an act to hide her kinder nature.

 Voiced by: Naoko Takano (Melty Blood, Carnival Phantasm), Yūki Kuwahara (remake), Kana Ueda (Anime (2003)) (Japanese); Kari Wahlgren (English)
 The older of the twin maids in the Tohno mansion and is always seen to be smiling and cheerful. She is gifted with medicine. Beneath her warm demeanor, Kohaku hides a traumatic past that caused her and Hisui to switch personalities in the present.

Recurring characters

 Voiced by: Kotono Mitsuishi (Melty Blood, Carnival Phantasm), Haruka Tomatsu (remake), Akiko Kimura (Anime (2003)) (Japanese); Karen Strassman (English)
 A mysterious vagabond sorceress, who gives Shiki glasses that allow him to suppress his Mystic Eyes from its ongoing activation. She also appears in Witch on the Holy Night, a prequel to Tsukihime franchise, particularly connected to its remake timeline.

Voiced by: Makoto Furukawa (Remake), Takahiro Sakurai (Anime (2003)) (Japanese); Dave Wittenberg (English)
 Shiki's best friend and classmate, who frequently is absent from school.

 Voiced by: Omi Minami (Melty Blood, Carnival Phantasm), Minami Tanaka (remake), Kaori Tanaka (Anime (2003)) (Japanese); Carrie Savage (English)
 A classmate of Shiki. In the Far-side routes she becomes a Dead Apostle.

 Voiced by: Jōji Nakata (Melty Blood, Carnival Phantasm), Kenta Miyake (Anime (2003)) (Japanese); Jamieson Price (English)
 A Dead Apostle and the secondary antagonist of the Near-side routes in original game. In the remake of Near-side routes, he is a minor character.

 Voiced by: Ken Narita (Melty Blood, Carnival Phantasm, Fate/Grand Order Drama CD), Yōhei Azakami (remake), Hiroyuki Yoshino (Anime (2003)) (Japanese); Kirk Thornton (English)
 An 800-year-old Dead Apostle who uses reincarnation through possessing his current host as a path to immortality. His seventeenth host was Ciel. He is the main antagonist for the Near-side Routes.

 Voiced by: Yōhei Azakami (remake), Hiroyuki Yoshino (Anime (2003)) (Japanese); Kirk Thornton (English)
 Akiha's older brother, and the protagonist’s adoptive brother. He is also Roa’s current eighteenth host. The main antagonist in the Far-side routes.

 Voiced by: Ryoka Yuzuki (Melty Blood, Carnival Phantasm), Ikumi Hasegawa (remake)
 A small anthropomorphic mascot cat version of Arcueid who occasionally appears alongside a Teacher variant of Ciel as guides for the players who fell into the Bad Ending of a certain route they ended up. She is an interdimensional anthropomorphic alien cat known as Neco Spirit originating from the Great Cat's Village where most of her people's appearances are closely just like her and Arcueid, albeit with few differences in resembling one of their Earth counterparts in different Type-Moon timelines. While often making cameo appearances in Tsukihime-related media, Neco-Arc also appears in other non-Tsukihime media.

Remake exclusives

 Voiced by: Rina Hidaka
 A mysterious girl who Shiki meet sometimes in the city.

 Voiced by: Chikahiro Kobayashi
 The head of the Saiki branch family of the Tohno clan, his entire face is wrapped in black bandages due to burns. He looks down on Shiki, who was excommunicated from the Tohno family and hates him. In the original timeline, Gōto originally debuted in the sequel Kagetsu Tohya as a flashback character related to Shiki’s birth family, prior to being re-introduced in the remake timeline.

Voiced by: Mamiko Noto
 A scientist who claims to be an old acquaintance of Makihisa Tohno from university, due to her closeness with the Tohno family through him, she's been working for Akiha as a consultant in both architectural and medical matters. In Ciel's Route, it appears that Arach has a mysterious connection to the Dead Apostles since the French Incident, with one of them being a spider-themed vampire, leaving Arach's true origins a mystery.

 Voiced by: Ai Kayano
 A foreign teacher at Shiki's school whose actually a subordinate of Ciel and goes by the alias . Beneath her demeanor, Noel hides a traumatic past she had been endured since her village in France was destroyed by Roa when Ciel was his host thirteen years ago. In Ciel’s Route of the Near-Side storyline, she becomes a Dead Apostle and is executed immediately by Ciel out of misery.

 Voiced by: Ayane Sakura
 A young Italian man and the son of Laurentis (who's first mentioned in Fate/Extra), Mario is the bishop of the Holy Church despite only being a teenager. He got his nickname “The Puppeteer” due to his gauntlet-like weapon, “Piano Machine”, that allows him to use strings for combat purposes as well as controlling the movements of others (particularly Holy Church nuns, and even Noel in Arcueid's Route) like they were marionettes. He seeks Roa for his knowledge of immortality in order to fix his father’s aging problem, but eventually learns that all Roa's research has long since hit a dead end.

 Voiced by: Ryota Asari
 One of Mario's two direct subordinates.

Voiced by: Shuta Morishima
 One of Mario's two direct subordinates.

Voiced by: Kenjiro Tsuda
 A Russian Dead Apostle Ancestor that use to be a knight centuries ago, he possesses the ability to manipulate temperature which allows him to generate and project both fire and ice for different purposes. He serves as the secondary antagonist, replacing the role of NRVNQSR Chaos from the original game. He despises Roa, for tricking him into murdering his adopted mother, . In Ciel’s Route of the Near-Side storyline, he is directly responsible for Noel's downfall, despite his vampire bite not being that deep.

Development
The original story of Tsukihime was based on one of Kinoko Nasu's ideas for a novel. It featured Arcueid as a cold stereotypical vampire that is the complete opposite of her finished incarnation. The basis for Shiki was a middle-aged old, worn-down vampire who says to Arcueid upon her first approach "I have no interest in women I've already killed once." The tone of the story was the complete opposite and only the tagline of "a biting relationship between a murderer who can see death lines and a vampire" remained in the final version. Upon developing the story for Tsukihime, they pictured Arcueid as a cool and princess-like "Noble Vampire", but thought that it overlapped with Akiha's "Lady" character. All of the heroines spoke politely to the main character, so they figured that the only character who could fit the role of someone who didn't speak politely would be Arcueid. They eventually came up with the idea of a "pure white" vampire that developed her character very differently from the original version.  There was originally a planned Satsuki route for the original version, but it was later cut.

Several trial versions of Tsukihime were released before its full release. The first preview version of Tsukihime was a free promotional version of which 300 copies (on 3½ floppy disks) were produced and distributed at Comiket 56 in 1999. At the next Comiket 57 in late 1999, a demo was sold for 100 yen, with only 50 being produced and sold, also distributed on 3½ floppy disks. At Comiket 58 in 2000, Tsukihime Half Moon Edition was released. 300 copies were produced and sold for 1,000 yen each. This version contained Arcueid and Ciel's "Near Side of the Moon" storylines. The half moon edition came with bonuses including a coupon that would allow purchasers to claim the complete edition in the future. The complete edition of Tsukihime was first released at Comiket 59 in December 2000.

Type-Moon released Tsukihime Plus-Disc developed with NScripter engine in January 2001, a light-hearted addition to Tsukihime that featured two short stories: Alliance Of Illusionary Eyes and Geccha. The first edition included wallpapers, the first four chapters of The Garden of Sinners, an early demo version of Tsukihime, a contemporary Tsukihime demo, and two omakes featuring Tsukihime characters. The second edition Tsukihime Plus+Disc added two more stories: Geccha 2 and Kinoko's Masterpiece Experimental Theater. This version used the more capable KiriKiri engine. In April 2003, Type-Moon released , a three-disc set that included Tsukihime, Tsukihime Plus+Disc, Kagetsu Tohya, a remixed soundtrack, a trial version of Melty Blood and other assorted multimedia. The original visual novel was available to play with Game Boy Advance with the conversion software "Rinkai Tsukihime" distributed by the doujin circle "Inside-Cap".

In December 2001, Inside-Cap released an officially licensed program for Windows 98/Me/2000/XP that allowed customers to convert their PC copy of Tsukihime into a Game Boy Advance rom; the program was distributed via CD-ROM through retail and online shops.

Remake
A remake of Tsukihime was announced in 2008, with work commencing in 2012. Work was then suspended in 2013 due to Type Moon's work on Fate/Grand Order, before resuming in 2017. It was later announced that it would be released in two parts, with the first, titled Tsukihime –A piece of blue glass moon-, containing the "Near-side" part of the game. The game was released on PlayStation 4 and Nintendo Switch consoles on August 26, 2021 in Japan. The theme songs Seimeisen and Juvenile, as well as the ending themes Lost and Believer were written, composed and arranged by Kegani from Live Lab and performed by ReoNa, and released on CD on September 1, 2021.https://mdpr.jp/music/detail/2736490M  The soundtrack was composed by Hideyuki Fukasawa and Keita Haga, and was released as a set of eight CDs on November 24, 2021. Tsukihime -The other side of red garden-, containing the remake's equivalent of the "Far-side" part of the original, was teased in an unlockable secret trailer in Tsukihime -A piece of blue glass moon-.

The remake modernizes the setting of Tsukihime, having it take place in a large city in the 2014 (as opposed to the suburban town in 1999 of the original), and also makes changes to the plot. The remake also adds new characters, voice acting, and new character designs. Writer Kinoko Nasu has stated in interviews that he was inspired by Evangelion: 1.0 You Are (Not) Alone to make the changes, and when writing the remake, Arcueid's route was written to be a reproduction of the old Tsukihime, while Ciel's route was written to be new.

SequelKagetsu Tohya has teasers for a Tsukihime 2, and writer Kinoko Nasu's short stories talk. and Prelude fromTsukihime material books Plus Period published on October 22, 2004 and the Type-Moons Character material published on August 20, 2006 are set before it. References to it have been mostly been made into jokes during recent interviews, and they have displayed no current plans to actually create the project. According to Character material, the sequel would have been called Tsukihime: The Dark Six and would have revolved, at least in part, around a ritual gathering of Dead Apostle ancestors. Arcueid's sister Altrogue would have had a possible role.

Related media
Video gamesKagetsu Tohya is a sequel released in August 2001 that takes place one year after the events in the main Tsukihime storyline. Shiki gets into an accident and has a repeating dream sequence in which he must relive the same day over until he finds Len. As the player repeats each day they are able to make different choices which affect the flow of the narrative and unlock extra content in the game, including 10 short stories.Melty Blood is a PC dojin fighting game series developed by Type-Moon and French-Bread, originally released at Comiket 63 in 2002. The game features characters from the Tsukihime games as well as new characters specific for the games. Multiple updated versions of the game have been created as well as a sequel. It later spawned an arcade version, titled Act Cadenza, that was developed by Ecole Software and was then ported to the PlayStation 2. A decade later, Type-Moon and French-Bread collaborated once again to developed the fifth installment and reboot, Melty Blood: Type Lumina, featuring the characters from the remake titles.

Anime

A 12-episode anime television series adaptation titled  was directed by Katsushi Sakurabi and produced by J.C.Staff. The series was written by Hiroko Tokita and features original music by Toshiyuki Ōmori. It first aired between October 10 to December 26, 2003 on BS-i, TBS and Animax, who also subsequently broadcast it worldwide, including its English language networks in Southeast Asia and South Asia. Two pieces of theme music are used for the episodes; one opening theme and one ending theme. The reason for choosing "Lunar Legend Tsukihime" instead of the title "Tsukihime" is that the trademark of "Tsukihime" had already been used.

The anime plot is based on the route of Arcueid, but the staff thinks that it is difficult to include all the elements of the original in the short number of episodes of 12 episodes, so no important setting is drawn. In addition, some changes have been made to the settings and characters.

Geneon announced it had licensed the series for distribution in North America in 2004 under the title Tsukihime, Lunar Legend. Upon Geneon's American operations having shut down, the newly instituted licensor Sentai Filmworks acquired the North American rights to the series, with Section23 Films handling its distribution and marketing, along with other titles.

Print
A manga adaptation using the same Lunar Legend Tsukihime title as the anime, illustrated by Sasaki Shōnen, was serialized in ASCII Media Works' shōnen manga magazine Dengeki Daioh between October 2003 and September 2010. The plot largely follows the game's Arcueid route with a mix of the other routes. The chapters were collected in ten volumes published by ASCII Media Works. Tsukihime creator Kinoko Nasu has praised Sasaki's manga, saying that the settings mentioned in Tsukihime and Kagetsu Tohya are integrated without damaging the atmosphere of the original. Nasu also went on to say that Sasaki Shonen's manga was the greatest rival to the remake game project, and that Sasaki's stamp of approval after he playtested it meant there was "nothing to be afraid of". The manga was licensed for an English-language release in North America by ComicsOne in 2004. In 2005, DR Master took over the publication of ComicsOne's manga titles including Tsukihime. Six out of ten volumes were published.Tsuki no Sango is a short story by Kinoko Nasu for Maaya Sakamoto's Full Moon Recital Hall, a project organized by the Japanese online magazine Saizensen, that consisted of Sakamoto reading short novels in a theater while an accompanying short animation was aired in the background. Tsuki no Sango was the first of the recitals on December 21, 2010, and it was aired live on Ustream. The short movie was animated by Ufotable, which also animated The Garden of Sinners and Fate/Zero, and features drawings by Takashi Takeuchi and Chihiro Aikura. The animation used Frédéric Chopin composed music. The concept is "Tsukihime 3000" and the Princess Kaguya folktale. There is also a 42-page booklet version of the story with illustrations by Takeuchi and Aikura. Tsuki no Sango also got a manga adaptation with story and art by Sasaki Shōnen. It was serialized on the Saizensen web magazine from July 7, 2012 until January 22, 2019. The chapters were compiled into two tankobon volumes published by Seikaisha Comics. The first volume was released on March 10, 2014 and the second volume on May 26, 2019. An omnibus version was also published on May 26, 2019.

Music
A remake of the visual novel's soundtrack was released on February 24, 2004 titled Ever After ~Music from "Tsukihime" Reproduction~. Two soundtrack compilations were released for the anime Lunar Legend Tsukihime, titled Moonlit Archives and Moonlit Memoirs. The music was composed by Keita Haga. The Tsukihime –A piece of blue glass moon- theme songs by ReoNa were released on CD on September 1, 2021 while the eight disc soundtrack, which was composed by Keita Haga and Hideyuki Fukasawa, was released on November 24, 2021.

Reception
Following its release, Tsukihime -A Piece of Blue Glass Moon- sold 72,237 units on the Nintendo Switch and 66,171 units on the PlayStation 4, bringing it to a total of 138,408 copies sold at retail. This does not include download sales. Frontline Gaming Japan reviewed Tsukihime -A Piece of Blue Glass Moon-'' stating that it "does a fantastic job of modernising Tsukihime, with an exceptional presentation and enough changes to make the story feel like something new to old players while retaining its identity."

The manga series has shown high sales figures in its later volumes, with volume seven staying in the Japanese comic ranking for two weeks, while volume eight stayed in for three weeks.

Carlos Santos of Anime News Network's opinion on the anime's third DVD release is that it "is a show that's all about creating a mood, which it does very well with its carefully planned color schemes and evocative music score." He states, "It's an ending that takes its time, however, as this show's deliberate pacing ensures that the story is revealed only to those who are patient enough."

Notes

References

Further reading

External links

Official website 
Lunar Legend Tsukihime official website 
Tsukihime anime  at J.C. Staff 

Tsukihime
2000 video games
2003 manga
2003 anime television series debuts
Anime television series based on video games
ASCII Media Works manga
Bishōjo games
ComicsOne titles
Dengeki Comics
Dengeki Daioh
Doujin video games
Eroge
Geneon USA
Incest in fiction
Incest in anime and manga
J.C.Staff
Japan-exclusive video games
Madman Entertainment anime
Manga based on video games
NBCUniversal Entertainment Japan
NScripter games
Romance video games
Sentai Filmworks
Shōnen manga
Siblicide in fiction
TBS Television (Japan) original programming
Type-Moon
Vampires in anime and manga
Video games about vampires
Video games about siblings
Video games developed in Japan
Visual novels
Windows games
Windows-only games
HuneX games